Madara may refer to:
Madara (manga), a 1987 Japanese media franchise
Madara (village), in Bulgaria
Madara (EP), EP by The Gazette
Madara (music video), video album by The Gazette
Madara Uchiha, a character in the manga/anime series Naruto
Madara, also called Nyanko-sensei, a character in the manga/anime series Natsume's Book of Friends

People 
John Madara, songwriter and record producer
Madara Chennaiah, a 12th-century Kannada vachana poet and saint who was a cobbler by profession.
Madara Līduma (born 1982), World Cup level Latvian biathlete
Madara Mālmane (born 1989), Latvian model
Madara Palameika (born 1987), Latvian javelin thrower

See also
Madaras (disambiguation)
Madara Rider, an early medieval large rock relief and UNESCO World Heritage site in northeastern Bulgaria
Madara Peak, a 430m peak in Vidin Heights, Livingston Island
Madara Cosmetics, a Latvian manufacturer of organic skin care products